In computing, a full-screen writing program or distraction-free editor is a text editor that occupies the full display with the purpose of isolating the writer from the operating system (OS) and other applications. In this way, one should be able to focus on the writing alone, with no distractions from the OS and a cluttered interface. Often, distraction-free editors feature a dark background and a text field, with lighter colored text. However, most distraction-free editors include customisable user interfaces. Some editors support rich text editing.

List of full screen editors

Free and open-source

Freeware

Proprietary

Features

Rich text support 

Some distraction-free editors support rich text editing. These include CreaWriter, TextRoom, and WriteRoom. In some cases, this feature turned off per default and must be set by a user.

Syntax highlighting 

Currently, only a few distraction-free editors support syntax highlighting. CodeRoom is an open source project with the purpose of creating a distraction-free code editor with customisable highlighting schemes. The latest version of Marave supports syntax highlighting. Sublime Text supports a distraction-free full-screen view. Packages exist for GNU Emacs that turn off various features and reformat the display to a distraction-free layout while retaining syntax highlighting and other features familiar to Emacs users.

Aids to writing 

Word count is a common feature in these editors. Other aids can include spell checkers, auto-corrections and quick text templates.

Other Features
Many of the programs include timers to pace writing. FocusWriter and WriteMonkey, among others, include typewriter sound effects.

See also
Text editor

References

Text editors